The Who, then known as The Detours, began performing in mid-1962 in a variety of line-ups before the band members became more settled, along with their roles within the group.

History
In the group's earliest days, singer Colin Dawson handled lead vocals while Roger Daltrey played lead guitar and Pete Townshend played rhythm guitar. With Dawson leaving the group in early 1963, Daltrey and singer/bassist Gabby Connolly took over lead vocals, although Connolly would only remain with the group until May of that year; both Daltrey and John Entwistle would also play brass instruments (specifically Daltrey on trombone and Entwistle on trumpet) during certain trad or Dixieland jazz numbers that were part of the group's repertoire before they moved to predominantly R&B material. By mid-1963, Daltrey would become the full-time lead vocalist, with Townshend handling all guitar duties. Drummer Doug Sandom rounded out the group, who performed in and around London at this time.

As no recordings exist from this period, little is known about the band's set lists. However, the band did reportedly perform several Beatles covers, including "I Saw Her Standing There", as well as numbers like Chuck Berry's "Come On". Townshend's first songwriting effort "It Was You" was also part of the group's act early on.

The group would be known as The Who starting in 1964, the same year Keith Moon would join the band, replacing Doug Sandom on drums.

Tour band
Roger Daltrey – lead vocals, lead guitar, harmonica, trombone
Pete Townshend – rhythm guitar, lead guitar
John Entwistle – trumpet, bass guitar, occasional lead vocals
Doug Sandom – drums 
Colin Dawson – lead vocals (1962)
Gabby Connolly – lead vocals, bass guitar (early-mid-1963)

Performance dates

See also
List of The Who tours and performances

References

External links
The Who Online Concert Guide (1962)
The Who Online Concert Guide (1963)

1963 concert tours
The Who concert tours
1962 concert tours